Lists of comics:
 List of comic books
 List of comic books on CD/DVD
 List of comic strips
 List of comics and comic strips made into feature films
 List of comics solicited but never published
 List of feminist comic books
 List of limited series
 Lists of webcomics
 List of wrestling-based comic books
 List of comedians

By country
List of American comics
List of Franco-Belgian comics series
List of Indian comics
List of Italian comics
Lists of manga
Lianhuanhua listed by year
List of manhua
List of manhwa licensed in English
List of Philippine comics
List of Spanish comics

By genre
List of dystopian comics
List of fantasy comics
List of furry comics
List of romance comics

Based on works
List of comics based on fiction
List of comics based on films
List of comics based on video games
List of comics based on television programs
List of Star Wars comic books

See also
 :Category:Lists of comics

Lists of mass media lists